Salvator, original spelling of Salvador, may refer to:

 Paulaner Salvator, the original doppelbock brand
 Salvator (lizard), a genus of lizards
 Salvator (horse) (1886–1909), an American thoroughbred racehorse
 Salvator of Horta (1520–1567), a Spanish saint

People with the given name
 Salvator Cicurel (1893–1975), Egyptian fencer and Jewish community leader
 Salvator Cupcea (1908–1958), Romanian physician
 Salvator Fabris (1544–1618), Italian fencing master from Padua
 Salvator Kacaj (born 1967), Albanian footballer
 Salvator Rosa (1615–1673), Italian Baroque painter, poet and printmaker
 Salvator Tongiorgi (1820–1865), Italian Jesuit philosopher and theologian

See also 
 Salvador (disambiguation)
 Salvator Mundi, a subject in iconography depicting Christ with his right hand raised in blessing
 Salvatore (disambiguation)